Bettella is a surname. Notable people with the surname include: 

Davide Bettella (born 2000), Italian footballer
Francesco Bettella (born 1989), Italian Paralympic swimmer